The 2018 WPSL season is the 22nd season of the Women's Premier Soccer League. The Central Conference consists of 4 sections.

Standings

Central Region

Northern Conference

Heartland Conference

Red River Conference

Mountain Conference

East Region

Midwest Conference

Metropolitan Conference

Mid-Atlantic Conference

Ohio Valley Conference

South Region

Carolinas Conference

Sunshine Conference

Southeast Conference

Gulf Conference

West Region

Northwest Conference

Pac North Conference – Bay Area

Desert Division

Coastal Conference

Pac South Conference

References

Women's Premier Soccer League seasons
United States Adult Soccer Association leagues
2